Tudi Township is a township in Wulong District, Chongqing, China. , it administers Yanhe Village, Xiaoyan Village, Tiansheng Village, and Liujing Village.

References 

Township-level divisions of Chongqing